HMS Ambuscade was a Type 21 frigate of the Royal Navy. She was built by Yarrow Shipbuilders Ltd, Glasgow, Scotland.  She entered service in 1975. Ambuscade took part in the Falklands War of 1982.

Service history
Ambuscade was launched on 18 January 1973 by Lady Griffin, wife of the Controller of the Navy, and was commissioned at Devonport on 5 September 1975. During 1976 and 1977 her commander was Peter Abbott who subsequently attained Flag rank.

Ambuscade took part in the Falklands War of 1982, serving as an Electronic Warfare picket ship to the Task Force, 
and taking part in several bombardments of Argentine positions. On 25 May Ambuscade was targeted by two Exocet missiles fired by Argentine Super Étendard strike aircraft.  Ambuscade detected the aircraft at 30 miles and the missile launch at 22 miles, first with radar then visually, and fired chaff decoys in an attempt to confuse the missiles' seekers.  Both missiles then locked on to SS Atlantic Conveyor impacting her port quarter, and setting her on fire. Atlantic Conveyor sank whilst under tow on 28 May. On the night of 13 June she fired 228 4.5-inch shells in support of 2 Para's assault of Wireless Ridge.

On 27 April 1983, Ambuscade was conducting tactical manoeuvres with ships of the United States Navy in the Indian Ocean. During the course of the exercise, she collided with the guided missile cruiser , resulting in part of her bow being torn away. Ambuscade was laid up in Bombay for six weeks while a new bow was constructed and fitted. Whilst laid up, some of the crew performed as extras in the film On Wings of Fire. There was enough damage to have Dale dry docked when she returned to Jacksonville, Florida. Ambuscade was in collision with the trawler Ester Colleen in heavy fog off Torbay on 26 October 1983. The trawler was badly holed in the collision.

From November 1983 to February 1984, Ambuscade served as a West Indies Guardship. On 8 June 1984, Ambuscade went to the assistance of the schooner Stena of Sitoo, which had struck an object in the North Sea and been holed below the waterline.

In late 1984, suffering from cracking in her hull, she was taken in for refitting, with a steel plate being welded down each side of the ship. At the same time modifications were made to reduce hull noise and four Exocet launchers were added in front of the bridge.

In 1993, she was decommissioned and sold to Pakistan and recommissioned as PNS Tariq, and remains in active service.

In December 2021, it was announced that it was hoped that when decommissioned, she could be returned to the United Kingdom for preservation as a museum ship.

In February 2023, it was announced that the Royal Navy was backing the plan to return her to the United Kingdom and will be preserved in Glasgow.

References

Bibliography

External links

 

Type 21 frigates
Falklands War naval ships of the United Kingdom
1973 ships
Ships built on the River Clyde